Pacific Grove Municipal Golf Links is a public 18-hole golf course owned by the city of Pacific Grove, California.

Originally designed by Chandler Egan in 1932, the first nine holes are laid out through the forested areas of Pacific Grove. The back nine was designed by Jack Neville, original designer of the Pebble Beach Golf Links in Pebble Beach, California, and overlook Point Pinos, where the Pacific Ocean and Monterey Bay meet on the northern tip of the Monterey Peninsula. The golf links is also site of the Point Pinos Lighthouse. The 18-hole golf course features a restaurant as well as a golf pro shop.

Pacific Grove Municipal Golf Links was ranked by Zagat Survey as one of America's Best Golf Courses and by Golf Magazine as One of the Nation's Top 50 Golf Courses Under $50.

Scorecard

References

External links

Golf clubs and courses in California
Sports venues in Monterey County, California
Pacific Grove, California